The Algerian Ligue Professionnelle 1 is the professional association football league of Algeria. This is a list of Algerian Ligue Professionnelle 1 winning football managers.

Seasons and winning managers

By individual

By nationality

References

 

Algerian Ligue Professionnelle 1